This is a list of writers who have written in the Nepali language irrespective of their nationality.

A

B

C

D

G

H
* H.B. Khatri youth writer( poet,novelist, story)
 Hari Bhakta Katuwal (Poet, Lyricist)

I

J

K

L

M

N

P

R

S

T

U

V

Y

Writers
Authors
Nepali
Authors